The Rooster is the tenth of the 12-year cycle of animals which appear in the Chinese zodiac related to the Chinese calendar. The Year of the Rooster is represented by the Earthly Branch symbol 酉. 

In the Tibetan zodiac and the Gurung zodiac, the bird is in place of the Rooster.

Years and the five elements
People born within these date ranges can be said to have been born in the "Year of the Rooster", while bearing the following elemental signs:

Basic astrology elements

See also
Rooster
Birds in Chinese mythology
Fenghuang

References

Further reading

External links

Mythological and legendary Chinese birds
Chinese astrological signs
Vietnamese astrological signs
Legendary birds
Birds in mythology
de:Chinesische Astrologie#Zählung ab Jahresbeginn